Alvera Rita Kalina, (née Frederic, October 21, 1921April 5, 2014) was a multiracial American who passed as white. After her marriage she kept the secret of her heritage from her children. She is the subject of White Like Her: My Family's Story of Race and Racial Passing, written by her daughter, Gail Lukasik.

Early life 
Her parents were Camille Kilbourne and Azemar Alfred Frederic (born 1897). She was listed in the Louisiana census as 'Col', or colored.

Personal life 
Alvera Rita Frederic Kalina was born in 1921 to Camille Kilbourne and Azemar Frederic. Camille was of English and Scottish heritage and Alvera considered her father's lineage to be of French stock. Theirs was a brief union, both later remarried and had separate families.

Albert Girard, Azemar's maternal grandfather and Celeste Girard Frederic, his mother, were both listed in the 1900 census with the appellation, B. in the column for race, indicating that they were black. Azemar's father was Leon Frederic, who lived in the Girard household at 379 Ursuline Avenue in New Orleans. Azemar and Camille married and moved to 2921 St. Ann St., where Alvera was born. Under the rules of the day in the south, (the one-drop rule), this made Alvera, their daughter and a descendant of French-Creoles, also black. However, the 1930 census has her father Azemar Frederic classified as W.—or white.

The 1940 census listed Alvera Frederic as black. She was working as a server in a teashop at the time and moved north to Ohio four years later, married Harold Kalina, a white man.

Like some black Americans at the time, Alvera passed as white for socioeconomic benefit. She feared her friends finding out what was for the time, a 'dirty secret'. She did not inform their children of their racial heritage.

In 1997, 2 years after the death of her father, Gail Lukasik confronted her mother with what her genealogy search had uncovered, namely that Alvera was listed as colored in the census and on her birth certificate, which had been confirmed by the State of Louisiana in a letter. Denial was the initial response, then Alvera broke down and shamefully confessed. She made Gail swear not to tell a soul, not even her brother, until she died. It was a solemn promise Gail would keep for 17 years. All her mother's quirks seemed to fall into place. Wearing make-up to bed, "in case you suddenly took ill and went to a hospital you had to look your best!". Or her fear of sunlight, and the obsessive neatness of her house, where you could eat off the floor, or the dramatic Sunday church entrances where they took the first pew and a neighbor royally derided them as 'the first family'. Gail confided to her husband and her children, who seemed not the least encumbered by their newly found black heritage.

Genealogy Roadshow 
Gail's son, a PhD. candidate, became the family researcher and he compiled a binder that contained the family history. Then came the Genealogy Roadshow, who did follow-up investigations and a DNA test. Gail's story was chosen for a television episode that traced her genealogy from a free man of color, Leon Frederic, who served in the Louisiana Native Guards during the Civil War. Gail's reservation about signing a contract was ameliorated when the producers altered it to allow her to retain the rights to the story. They shot backstory with her in her hometown on August 7, 2014, in Libertyville, Illinois.

Lukasik, kept the secret for seventeen years before publishing her story in a book, White Like Her: My Family's Story of Race and Racial Passing.

Further reading 
 Tragic mulatto
 Passing (novel)
 The Autobiography of an Ex-Colored Man
 Imitation of Life (1959 film)

References 

1921 births
2014 deaths
American people of Creole descent
African-American history of Louisiana
20th-century women
20th-century American people
Louisiana Creole people